Green Balloon may refer to:
 Zielony Balonik (Green Balloon, in Polish), a literary cabaret in Kraków
 Green Balloon Club, a children's program on the BBC